HMS Loch Killin was a  of the Royal Navy, named after Loch Killin in Scotland. The ship was laid down at Burntisland Shipbuilding Company's yard in Fife on 2 June 1943, and launched on 29 November 1943. She was one of the first vessels armed with the brand new Squid anti-submarine mortar. Decommissioned in September 1945, the ship was put into Reserve, and finally scrapped on 24 August 1960.

Service history

1944

Lock Killin along with the sloop  sank the German submarine  on 31 July 1944 to the west of Land's End. This was the first submarine kill using the Squid anti-submarine mortar. On 6 August 1944 Loch Killin sank .

1945
In January and February 1945 Loch Killin was detached for service in the English Channel providing convoy escort and support for short periods, before the rest of 17 EG was transferred to Plymouth for support duty in the Channel in April. On 15 April 1945 Loch Killin sank  in the English Channel west of Land's End, in position , with gunfire and depth charges.

After the German surrender in May 1945 Loch Killin and 17 EG returned to the Clyde. In June the ship was transferred to the Rosyth Escort Force to escort convoys to Norway, paying visits to Stavanger, Bergen and Trondheim. In September Loch Killin sailed to Dartmouth to decommission.

Decommissioning and disposal
After her stores and supplies were removed Loch Killin was put into the Reserve on 7 November 1945 as a Category "B" vessel. The ship was later transferred to Plymouth, and nominated for modernisation, but this was cancelled in June 1951. The ship was transferred to the Reserve Fleet at Penarth in June 1956, and finally placed on the Disposal List on 12 April 1960. The ship was sold for demolition by John Cashmore Ltd of Newport, and the ship was towed to the breaker's yard on 24 August 1960.

References

Bibliography
 
 Service Histories of Royal Navy Warships in World War II : HMS Loch Killin
 Uboat.net : HMS Loch Killin

 

Killin (K391)
World War II frigates of the United Kingdom
1943 ships